Venustas is a genus of sea snails, marine gastropod mollusks in the family Calliostomatidae within the superfamily Trochoidea, the top snails, turban snails and their allies.

Venustas Finlay, 1927 is an officially rejected name (ICZN Opinion 479).

Species
  †Venustas fragilis (Finlay, 1923) 
Synonyms
 Venustas blacki Powell, 1950: synonym of Calliostoma (Maurea) blacki (Powell, 1950)
 Venustas couperi Vella, 1954: synonym of Calliostoma blacki (Powell, 1950)
 Venustas cunninghami cunninghami Dell, 1950: synonym of Calliostoma (Maurea) selectum (Dillwyn, 1817)
 Venustas cunninghami regifica Finlay, 1927: synonym of Calliostoma (Maurea) selectum (Dillwyn, 1817)
 Venustas cunninghami pagoda Dell, 1950: synonym of Calliostoma (Maurea) selectum (Dillwyn, 1817)
 Venustas foveauxana Dell, 1950: synonym of Calliostoma (Maurea) foveauxanum (Dell, 1950)
 Venustas megaloprepes Powell, 1955: synonym of Calliostoma (Maurea) megaloprepes (Tomlin, 1948)
 Venustas pellucida pellucida Dell, 1950: synonym of Calliostoma (Maurea) pellucidum (Valenciennes, 1846)
 Venustas pellucida spirata Dell, 1950: synonym of Calliostoma (Maurea) pellucidum (Valenciennes, 1846)
 Venustas punctulata multigemmata Powell, 1952: synonym of  Calliostoma granti (Powell, 1931)
 Venustas punctulata punctulata  Dell, 1950: synonym of Calliostonia (Maurea) punctulatum (Martyn, 1784)
 Venustas punctulata urbanior Deii, 1950: synonym of Calliostonia (Maurea) punctulatum (Martyn, 1784)
 Venustas spectabile Dell, 1950: synonym of Calliostoma (Maurea) spectabile (A. Adams, 1855)
 Venustas tigris chathamensis Dell, 1950: synonym of Calliostoma (Maurea) tigris (Gmelin, 1791)
 Venustas tigris tigris Dell, 1950: synonym of Calliostoma (Maurea) tigris (Gmelin, 1791)
 Venustas (Mucrinops) osbornei Firilay, 1926: synonym of Calliostoma (Maurea) osbornei Powell, 1926
 Venustas (Mucrinops) punctulata punctulata Finiay. 1926: synonym of Calliostonia (Maurea) punctulatum (Martyn, 1784)
 Venustas (Mucrinops) punctulata urbanior' Finlay, 1926: synonym of Calliostonia (Maurea) punctulatum (Martyn, 1784)
 Venustas (Mucrinops) spectabilis  Finlay, 1926: synonym of Calliostoma (Maurea) spectabile (A. Adams, 1855)
 Venustas (Venustas) hodgei Finlay, 1926: synonym of Calliostoma (Maurea) selectum (Dillwyn, 1817)
 Venustas (Venustas) cunninghami Finlay, 1926: synonym of Calliostoma (Maurea) selectum (Dillwyn, 1817)
 Venustas (Venustas) pellucida Finlay, 1926: synonym of Calliostoma (Maurea) pellucidum (Valenciennes, 1846)
 Venustas (Venustas) ponderosa Finlay, 1926: synonym of Calliostoma (Maurea) selectum (Dillwyn, 1817)
 Venustas (Venustas) tigris Finlay, 1926: synonym of Calliostoma (Maurea) tigris (Gmelin, 1791)
 Venustas (Venustas) undulala Finlay, 1926: synonym of Calliostoma (Maurea) pellucidum (Valenciennes, 1846)

References

 Allan, R. S. (1926). The geology and palaeontology of the Lower Waihao Basin, South Canterbury, New Zealand. Transactions of the New Zealand Institute. 57: 265-309 NIZT 682
 Dell. R K. 1950. The molluscan genus Venustas in New Zealand waters. Dominion Museum (Wellington) Records in Zoology 5:39-54
 Marshall B.A. (1995), A Revision of the Recent Calliostoma Species of New Zealand (Mollusca: Gastropoda: Trochoidea)''; The Nautilus 108 (4), p. 83-127

External links
 To World Register of Marine Species

Calliostomatidae
Monotypic gastropod genera